This page details the career achievements of Nigerian American basketball player Hakeem Olajuwon.

NBA statistics

Averages

Totals

Career highs

Top shot-blocking efforts

Regular season

Playoffs

NBA regular season leader
 Blocks per game: 1990 (4.6), 1991 (3.9), 1993 (4.2)
 Rebounds per game: 1989 (13.5), 1990 (14.0)
 Offensive rebounds: 1985 (440)
 Defensive rebounds: 1989 (767), 1990 (850)
 Total rebounds: 1989 (1,105), 1990 (1,149)
 Blocks: 1990 (376), 1993 (342)
 Personal fouls: 1985 (344)
 Field goal attempts: 1994 (1,694)
 Games played: 1985 (82), 1989 (82), 1990 (82), 1999 (50)

Achievements
2× NBA champion (1994, '95)
2× NBA Finals MVP (1994, '95)
1× NBA MVP (1994)
2× Defensive Player of Year (1993, '94)
6× All-NBA First Team (1987, '88, '89, '93, '94, '97)
3× All-NBA Second Team ('86, '90, '96)
3× All-NBA Third Team (1991, '95, '99)
5× All-Defensive First Team ('87, '88, '90, '93, '94)
4× All-Defensive Second Team ('85, '91, '96, '97)
12× All-Star
Olympic gold medalist (1996)
Named one of the 50 Greatest Players in NBA History (1996).
Olajuwon ended his career in the top ten all-time in blocks, scoring, rebounding, and steals. He is the only player in NBA history to retire in the top ten for all four categories (he is now 11th all-time in rebounding).
Olajuwon was elected to the Naismith Memorial Basketball Hall of Fame as a member of the class of 2008.
 Ranked #10 in ESPN'''s All-Time #NBArank: Counting down the greatest players ever (published in 2016)
 Ranked #12 in SLAM Magazines 2018 revision of the top 100 greatest players of all time (published in the January 2018 issue)

NBA records

Regular seasonMost points scored without free throw attempt in a game: Houston Rockets (109) vs. Denver Nuggets (113), 
48 points - 24/40 FG%
Broken by Jamal Murray in Third player in NBA history to record a quadruple-double in a game: Houston Rockets (120) vs. Milwaukee Bucks (94), 
18 points, 16 rebounds, 10 assists, 11 blocks (and 1 steal) in 40 minutes
Nate Thurmond, Alvin Robertson and David Robinson are the only other players to achieve this.Seasons leading the league in defensive rebounds: 2 (—)
Broken by Dennis Rodman in Consecutive seasons leading the league in defensive rebounds: 2 (—)
Broken by Kevin Garnett in Blocked shots, career: 3,830Consecutive seasons leading the league in blocked shots: 2 (—)
Broken by Dikembe Mutombo in Steals by a center, career: 2,162Steals by a center, season: 213
Also holds second (see below)Five by fives, career: 6Only player in NBA history to record 200 blocks and 200 steals in the same season: 282 blocks, 213 stealsSeasons with 200 blocks and 100 steals: 11 (—)
Only twelve players in NBA history have achieved this feat in the same season.Third player in NBA history to lead the league in blocks and rebounding in the same season: 14.0 rebounds and 4.6 blocks per game
Also achieved by Kareem Abdul-Jabbar (Los Angeles Lakers), Bill Walton (Portland Trail Blazers), Ben Wallace (Detroit Pistons), and Dwight Howard (Orlando Magic,  and ).Only player in NBA history to win regular season MVP, Finals MVP and Defensive Player of the Year awards in the same seasonOnly center in NBA history to record at least 200 steals in a seasonClosest player in NBA history to recording a quintuple double38 points, 17 rebounds, 6 assists, 7 steals, 12 blocks in a double-overtime game against the Seattle SuperSonics on March 10, 1987
28 points, 19 rebounds, 9 assists, 5 steals, 11 blocks in a regulation game against the Golden State Warriors on March 3, 1990Only player in NBA history to lead his team in averaging 4 out of 5 main categories for 8 straight seasons (minimum 50 games)Olajuwon led his team in averaging points, rebounds, steals, and blocks from the 1985/86 to 1992/93 seasons, and again in 1994/95Most seasons in a row with 150 blocks and 100 steals 12 seasons in a row (1985-86 - 1996-97)

PlayoffsOnly player in NBA history to lead his team in all 5 categories (points, rebounds, assists, steals, blocks) on to the NBA title: (1994 NBA Playoffs)Only player in NBA history to win an NBA Championship without a Hall of Famer or All star In the 4-Round Playoff Format: (1994 NBA Playoffs)
 Otis Thorpe was an all-star in the 1991/92 season, but not in 1994. Hakeem missed 12 games in the 1991/92 season in which the Rockets went 2-10 and missed the playoffs
 Rick Barry won the 1975 NBA Finals without an All-star, but with Rookie Hall of Famer Jamaal Wilkes
 Barry did not do this in the 4-Round Playoff Format like Hakeem, however
 Bill Walton won the 1977 NBA Finals without a Hall of Fame teammate, but with Hall of Fame coach Jack Ramsay and 1977 All-star Maurice LucasScoring 30 or more points in all games, any playoff series: twice 
4 games, vs. Dallas Mavericks (1988 Western Conference First Round)
4 games, vs. Orlando Magic (1995 NBA Finals)
Also achieved by Elgin Baylor, Jerry West, Rick Barry, Bernard King, Michael Jordan (seven times), and Shaquille O'Neal.Points, 4-game series: 150, vs. Dallas Mavericks, 1988 Western Conference First Round (37.5 ppg)Field goals made, one postseason: 306 (1995)Field goal attempts, 4-game series: 116, vs. Orlando Magic (1995 NBA Finals)
Broken by Tracy McGrady in 2001Offensive rebounds, 5-game series: 33, vs. Utah Jazz, 1985 Western Conference First Round
Broken by Larry Smith in 1987Steals, quarter: 4, at Los Angeles Lakers, 
Tied with many other playersHighest average, blocked shots per game, career: 3.3 (472/145)Blocked shots, one postseason: 92 (1994)Blocked shots, 4-game series: 23, vs. Los Angeles Lakers, 1990 Western Conference First Round (5.8 bpg)
Also holds second (see below)Blocked shots, 5-game series: 29, vs. Los Angeles Clippers, 1993 Western Conference First Round (5.8 bpg)
Broken by Dikembe Mutombo in 1994Blocked shots, 7-game series: 30, vs. Seattle SuperSonics, 1993 Western Conference Semifinals (4.3 bpg)
Broken by Dikembe Mutombo in 1994

Blocked shots, game: 10, at Los Angeles Lakers, 
Tied with Mark EatonBlocked shots, half: 7, vs. Portland Trail Blazers, 
Broken by Derrick Coleman on Blocked shots, quarter: 5, third quarter, at Utah Jazz, 
Broken by Dwight Howard on Part of the second pair of players in NBA playoff history to score 40 or more points in the same game: Houston Rockets at Dallas Mavericks,  
Olajuwon: 41 points 
Eric "Sleepy" Floyd: 42 pointsPart of the third pair of players in NBA playoff history to score 40 or more points in the same game: Houston Rockets vs. Utah Jazz,  
Olajuwon: 40 points 
Clyde Drexler: 41 pointsPart of the only time in NBA playoff history when four players scored 30 or more points in the same game: Houston Rockets at Orlando Magic,  
Olaujuwon (Houston Rockets): 34 points 
Sam Cassell (Houston Rockets): 31 points (off the bench) 
Shaquille O'Neal (Orlando Magic): 33 points 
Penny Hardaway (Orlando Magic): 32 pointsClosest player in history to recording a five-by-five during a playoff gameOn four separate occasions, Olajuwon was 1 steal shy of recording a five-by-five in a playoff game
 Game 1 of the 1987 Western Conference First Round against the Portland Trail Blazers
 Game 4 of the 1987 Western Conference First Round against the Portland Trail Blazers
 Game 1 of the 1993 Western Conference First Round against the Los Angeles Clippers
 Game 5 of the 1994 Western Conference Finals against the Utah Jazz

Olajuwon was also one assist shy of recording a five-by-five in a playoff game on another occasion
 Game 1 of the 1986 Western Conference Semifinals against the Denver Nuggets

Chris Webber was also 1 steal shy of a playoff five-by-five in Game 4 of the 2000 Western Conference First Round against the Sacramento KingsAll-time leader in playoff five-by-fours (at least 4 points, 4 rebounds, 4 assists, 4 steals, and 4 blocks)

Olajuwon did this on a record 8 different occasions

 Game 1 of the 1986 Western Conference Semifinals against the Denver Nuggets
 Game 1 of the 1987 Western Conference First Round against the Portland Trail Blazers
 Game 4 of the 1987 Western Conference First Round against the Portland Trail Blazers
 Game 1 of the 1993 Western Conference First Round against the Los Angeles Clippers
 Game 2 of the 1994 Western Conference First Round against the Portland Trail Blazers
 Game 3 of the 1994 Western Conference Finals against the Utah Jazz
 Game 5 of the 1994 Western Conference Finals against the Utah Jazz
 Game 2 of the 1997 Western Conference First round against the Minnesota TimberwolvesMost playoff games of At least 2 steals and 2 blocks (56)
 At least 3 steals and 3 blocks (23)
 At least 4 steals and 4 blocks (12)
 At least 5 steals and 5 blocks (2)Most playoff runs simultaneously averaging 1.5+ steals and 1.5+ blocks per game Olajuwon has 8 such playoff runsMost playoff runs simultaneously averaging 2.0+ steals and 2.0+ blocks per game  Olajuwon has 5 such playoff runs. No other player has achieved this feat more than once.

NBA FinalsPoints, 4-game series: 131, vs. Orlando Magic, 1995
Broken by Shaquille O'Neal in 2002Scoring 30 or more points in all games, any championship series: 4 games, vs. Orlando Magic, 1995
Also achieved by Elgin Baylor (7 games, Los Angeles Lakers vs. Boston Celtics, 1962), Rick Barry (6 games, San Francisco Warriors vs. Philadelphia 76ers, 1967), Michael Jordan (6 games, Chicago Bulls vs. Phoenix Suns, 1993), and Shaquille O'Neal (6 games, Los Angeles Lakers vs. Indiana Pacers, 2000, and 4 games, Los Angeles Lakers vs. New Jersey Nets, 2002)Field goals made, 4-game series: 56, vs. Orlando Magic, 1995Field goal attempts, 4-game series: 116, vs. Orlando Magic, 1995Blocked shots, game: 8, vs. Boston Celtics, 
Broken by Dwight Howard on 

All-Star GameOffensive rebounds, game: 9 (1990)Blocked shots, half: 4 (1994)Personal fouls, game: 6 (OT) (1987)

Ranks 2nd in NBA history

Regular seasonSeasons leading the league in blocked shots: 3 (—)
Trailing Kareem Abdul-Jabbar, Mark Eaton and Marcus CambyBlocked shots, quarter: 7, fourth quarter, at Sacramento Kings, Steals by a center, season: 174
Also holds the record (see above)

PlayoffsPoints, one postseason: 725 (1995)Field goals made, 4-game series: 56, twice 
56, vs. Dallas Mavericks, 1988 Western Conference First Round 
56, vs. Orlando Magic, 1995 NBA FinalsDefensive rebounds, game: 19, at Dallas Mavericks, Personal fouls, 4-game series: 21, vs. Portland Trail Blazers, 1987 Western Conference First RoundPersonal fouls, quarter: 5, vs. Denver Nuggets, Blocked shots, career: 472
Trailing Kareem Abdul-JabbarBlocked shots, 4-game series: 20, vs. Portland Trail Blazers, 1987 Western Conference First Round (5.0 bpg)
Also holds the record (see above)Blocked shots, game: 9, vs. Los Angeles Clippers, 

FinalsBlocked shots, 7-game series: 27, vs. New York Knicks, 1994
Patrick Ewing blocked 30 shots for the Knicks in the same series, but the Rockets won the series.

All-StarBlocked shots, career: 23
Trailing Kareem Abdul-JabbarBlocked shots, game: 5 (1994)

Ranks 3rd in NBA history

Regular seasonDefensive rebounds, career: 9,714
Trailing Karl Malone and Robert ParishHighest average, blocked shots per game, career: 3.1 (3,830/1,238)
Trailing Mark Eaton and Manute Bol

PlayoffsField goal attempts, one postseason: 576 (1995)Blocked shots, 6-game series: 23, vs. Seattle SuperSonics, 1987 Western Conference Semifinals (3.8 bpg)Blocked shots, game: 8, three times 
8, vs. Boston Celtics,  
8, vs. Portland Trail Blazers,  
8, vs. Seattle SuperSonics, 

All-StarGames played: 12 (1985—1997, except 1991)Offensive rebounds, game: 7 (1988)

Ranks 4th in NBA history

Regular seasonConsecutive games with a blocked shot (since 1986—87): 83,  to 
Trailing Patrick Ewing (two streaks) and Dikembe Mutombo

PlayoffsSteals, game: 6, vs. Denver Nuggets, Blocked shots, game: 7, six times

Ranks 5th in NBA history

Regular season
Blocked shots, game: 12, twice 
12, vs. Seattle SuperSonics,  (2 OT)
12, vs. Utah Jazz, Olajuwon also ranks ninth in career regular season points scored (26,946)'Houston Rockets franchise records

Regular season

Service
Seasons: 17

Games played, career: 1,177

Games played, season: 82
tied with many other players

Minutes played, career: 42,844

Scoring
Points, career: 26,511

Games scoring 40 or more points, career: 32

Field goals
Field goals made, career: 10,555

Field goals made, game: 24, vs. Denver Nuggets, 

Field goal attempts, career: 20,573

Free throws
Free throws made, career: 5,376

Free throw attempts, career: 7,537

Rebounding
Rebounds, career: 13,382

Offensive rebounds, career: 3,936

Defensive rebounds, career: 9,446

Defensive rebounds, game: 22, at Detroit Pistons, 
Broken by Charles Barkley on 

Steals
Steals, career: 2,088

Steals, season: 213

Blocked shots
Blocked shots, career: 3,740

Highest average, blocked shots per game, career: 3.18 (3,740/1,177)

Blocked shots, season: 376

Personal fouls
Personal fouls, career: 4,236

Disqualifications, career: 80

Turnovers
Turnovers, career: 3,569

Other
Triple-doubles, career: 14
 Broken by James Harden
Double-doubles, career: 771

Playoffs

Service
Games played, career: 140

Minutes played, career: 5,663

Scoring
Points, career: 3,727

Scoring average, points per game, career: 26.6 (3,727/140)
Broken by Tracy McGrady

Scoring average, points per game, any playoff series: 37.5 (150/4), vs. Dallas Mavericks, 1988 Western Conference First Round

Points, game: 49, at Seattle SuperSonics,  (2 OT)

Points, quarter: 18, first quarter, vs. Utah Jazz, 

Field goals
Field goals made, career: 1,492

Field goals made, game: 20, at Utah Jazz, 

Field goal attempts, career: 2,825

Field goal attempts, game: 34, vs. Phoenix Suns, 

Free throws
Free throws made, none missed, game: 13—13, vs. Utah Jazz, 

Free throws made, career: 739

Free throws made, game: 18, vs. Los Angeles Clippers, 
tied with Moses Malone

Free throw attempts, career: 1,028

Free throw attempts, game: 20, thrice 
20, vs. Los Angeles Lakers,  
20, vs. Los Angeles Clippers,  
20, at Utah Jazz,  
tied with Moses Malone

Rebounding
Rebounds, career: 1,602

Rebounds, game: 26, at Dallas Mavericks, 
tied with Moses Malone

Defensive rebounds, game: 19, at Dallas Mavericks, 

Assists
Assists, career: 456

Steals
Steals, career: 238

Blocked shots
Blocked shots, career: 468

Blocked shots, game: 10, at Los Angeles Lakers, 

Field goal percentage, season: .538 (677—1,258)

Blocked shots, season: 220

Toronto Raptors franchise records
Defensive rebounds, half: 11, first half, at Milwaukee Bucks,

See also

Quadruple-double
List of National Basketball Association career games played leaders
List of National Basketball Association career scoring leaders
List of National Basketball Association career rebounding leaders
List of National Basketball Association career steals leaders
List of National Basketball Association career blocks leaders
List of National Basketball Association career free throw scoring leaders
List of National Basketball Association season rebounding leaders
List of National Basketball Association season blocks leaders
List of National Basketball Association players with 10 or more blocks in a game
List of NCAA Division I men's basketball season rebounding leaders

References

Olajuwon, Hakeem